In molecular biology, the Hsp17 thermometer is an RNA element (RNA thermometer) found in the 5' UTR of Hsp17 mRNA. Hsp17 is a cyanobacterial heat shock protein belonging to the Hsp20 family.

At physiological temperature (28 degrees Celsius) the Hsp17 thermometer forms a hairpin structure, preventing translation of Hsp17. Under heat shock conditions the hairpin structure melts and translation takes place.

See also
RNA thermometer
ROSE element
FourU thermometer
Hsp90 cis-regulatory element
Cyanobacterial RNA thermometers

References

Cis-regulatory RNA elements